Lübeck is a German city, founded in 1143.

Lübeck or Lubeck may also refer to:

Places

Germany
 Free City of Lübeck, an independent city-state, 1226–1937
 Lübeck law, constitution of a municipal form of government developed at Lübeck after it was made a free city in 1226
 Liubice, also known as Old-Lübeck, predecessor of the modern city of Lübeck
 Prince-Bishopric of Lübeck, 1180–1803, a state of the Holy Roman Empire

Groups and places in the modern city of Lübeck
 Fachhochschule Lübeck, a university in the city of Lübeck
 Lübeck Academy of Music, higher level music school in Lübeck
 Lübeck Airport, also known as Hamburg Lübeck Airport, located south of Lübeck city centre and northeast of Hamburg. The airport serves the Hamburg Metropolitan Area and is second after Hamburg Airport
 Lübeck Cathedral, a large brick Lutheran cathedral in Lübeck, Germany and part of Lübeck's world heritage
 Theater Lübeck, large theater, formerly Stage of the Hansestadt Lübeck, colloquially Stadttheater
 VfB Lübeck, a German football club playing in Lübeck

United States
 Lubec, Maine, the easternmost town of the USA
 Lubeck, West Virginia, census-designated place in Wood County

People
 Marja Lubeck, New Zealand politician
 Vincent Lübeck (1654–1740), German organist and composer

Ships
 Adler von Lübeck, war galleon during the Northern Seven Years' War
 German frigate Lübeck (F214), a Bremen class frigate of the German Navy
 German frigate Lübeck (F224), a Köln class frigate of the German Navy
 Lisa von Lübeck, a reconstruction of a 15th-century caravel
 Lübeck (1844), a corvette of the former German navy; see Battle of Heligoland (1849)
  (1903), a Bremen-class cruiser of the German Imperial Navy